William Lawrence House may refer to:

 William Lawrence House (Taunton, Massachusetts), listed on the NRHP in Taunton, Massachusetts
 William Lawrence House (Bellefontaine, Ohio), listed on the NRHP in Ohio